The Bangladesh Karate Federation is the national federation for karate and is responsible for governing the sport in Bangladesh. Dr Md Mozammel Haque Khan, a commissioner of Anti-Corruption Commission, is the President of Bangladesh Karate Federation.  Kyaw Shwe Hla is the Secretary General of the Bangladesh Karate Federation.

History
The Bangladesh Karate Federation was established in 1972 as the Bangladesh Judo and Karate Federation.  Bangladesh Judo and Karate Federation divided into two, Bangladesh Karate Federation and Bangladesh Judo Federation, in 2001 by Lieutenant General M Harun-Ar-Rashid.

Japan Overseas Cooperation Volunteers sent Nonka, a karate player, to work with Bangladesh Karate Federation to develop karate in Bangladesh. Mitsuito Yoshido served as the coach of Bangladesh Karate Federation. In 1982, the federation held the first National Karate Championships in Bangladesh. In 2000s, JICA stopped providing coaches and supporting the karate federation.

References

Karate in Bangladesh
Karate organizations
1972 establishments in Bangladesh
Sports organizations established in 1972
Karate
Organisations based in Dhaka